Turkey and the Government of National Accord (GNA) of Libya signed a Maritime Boundary Treaty in order to establish an Exclusive economic zone in the Mediterranean Sea, which meant that they could claim rights to ocean bed resources. According to the list of maritime boundary treaties, this was the first agreement ever to be signed between the two countries. However, fears were expressed that the agreement may fuel an "energy showdown" in this region, because it was highly contentious.

This agreement was controversial and drew condemnation by the states in the region and the international community, including the rival Tobruk-based government led by Libya's Parliament (House of Representatives) and the Libyan National Army, the European Union, the United States of America, Greece, Russia, Egypt, Cyprus, Malta, France, Germany, Italy, Sweden, Serbia, Israel, Syria, Bahrain, Saudi Arabia, the United Arab Emirates and the Arab League, as a violation of the International Law of the Sea (UNCLOS) and the article 8 of the Skhirat Agreement which prohibits the Libyan Prime Minister from solely clinching international deals without consent of all the cabinet members. The accord's legitimacy and the legal consequences had been disputed. According to the European Union, it "infringed upon the sovereign rights of third States, did not comply with the United Nations' Law of the Sea and could not produce any legal consequences for third states". Both Cyprus and Egypt had dismissed the deal as "illegal", while Greece regarded it as "void" and "geographically absurd", because it ignored the presence of the Greek islands of Crete, Kasos, Karpathos, Kastellorizo and Rhodes between the Turkish–Libyan coasts.

On 5 December 2019, the Turkish Parliament ratified the maritime deal, where it had a strong backing by four of Turkey's five major political parties - with the exception of the pro-Kurdish People's Democracy Party (HDP). The Libyan Parliament however blocked the ratification and rejected the deal unanimously, with the President of the Parliament, Aguila Saleh Issa, sending a letter to the United Nations declaring it as null and void. Even though the ratification by the Libyan Parliament failed, GNA deposited the maritime agreement to the United Nations on December 27, with Turkey following on March 2 of the next year. On 14 July 2020, it is revealed that five countries sent a joint note verbale to the UN Secretariat calling for the agreement to not be registered and accepted, noting that, per UN procedures, its ratification by the Libyan Parliament is a prerequisite. On October 1, the UN Secretary-General, Antonio Guterres, registered the Turkey-GNA deal on the delimitation of maritime jurisdiction areas in the Mediterranean. The agreement "has been registered with the Secretariat, in accordance with Article 102 of the Charter of the United Nations," said the certificate of registration.

Nine months later, in August 2020, Greece and Egypt signed a maritime deal, demarcating an exclusive economic zone for oil and gas drilling rights, to counter the Turkey-GNA agreement.

The Turkish-GNA memorandum on maritime zones was cancelled by the Al-Bayda Court of Appeals of Libya in its 27 January 2021 ruling.

Turkey and GNA's position
According to the Turkish Newspaper Daily Sabah, the new agreement consists of the establishment of 200 Nautical miles of EEZ, and an establishment of 18.6 nautical miles of Continental shelf. The Turkish position, according to Recep Tayyip Erdoğan is that it is protecting its sovereign rights to the Blue economy and defending their legal claims to the disputed territory in the Mediterranean. Also, according to Anadolu Agency, EEZ boundaries' legality in the Mediterranean should be determined by continental shelves and mainland countries, rather than island based calculations.

In Libya, the signing of the memorandum was met with varying responses: it was welcomed by the supporters of the Tripoli-based Government of National Accord, but rejected by the Tobruk-based government which is backed by the Libyan House of Representatives and Khalifa Haftar's Libyan National Army (LNA). Ahmad Al Mismari, the official spokesman of Haftar's forces, rejected the agreement and warned that “military force will be deployed to prevent any violation of Libyan sovereignty”.  Members of the Libyan Parliament expressed similar sentiments, while its Speaker, Aguila Saleh Issa, sent a letter to UN Secretary-General, António Guterres, describing the deal as "null and void". Saleh argued that the agreement should be ratified by the Libyan Parliament, and that "Libya and Turkey do not have common maritime boundaries".

International Community's positions

The United States of America stated that the deal was "provocative" and a threat to the stability of the region.

European Commission Vice President Josep Borrell stated that the agreement signed by Turkey and GNA creates an infringement for third states, and does not comply with the Law of the sea. The president of The Republic of Cyprus, Nicos Anastasiades aimed to create a diplomatic movement in order to nullify the GNA-Turkish agreement. He has also stated that this movement would not include military options. Greece lodged objections to the UN and expelled the Libyan ambassador in response to the deal, infuriated at a pact which skirts the Greek island of Crete and infringes its continental shelf.

In Germany, the German Federal Parliament (Bundestag)'s research service reviewed the Turkey-GNA maritime deal and found it to be illegal under international law, and detrimental to third parties.

Israel's acting foreign minister Israel Katz announced his country's opposition to the maritime border accord between Ankara and Tripoli, and confirmed that the deal was "illegal". The Israeli perspective offered by the Jerusalem Center for Public Affairs also comments that the deal does not give sovereignty over the claimed waters to Turkey and Libya. Furthermore, it states that the third states were kept in the dark regarding the Libyan-Turkish agreement, hence leading to questions regarding its legitimacy.

In a Joint Declaration issued on 11 May 2020, Greece, Cyprus, Egypt joined by France and the United Arab Emirates, denounced the deal, arguing that it "cannot produce any legal consequences for third States", as it infringes upon the sovereign rights of Greece, and does not comply with the UN's Law of the Sea. Turkey called the Joint Statement hypocritical by "a group of countries who are seeking regional chaos and instability".

In August 2020, Egypt and Greece signed an agreement, designating an exclusive economic zone between the two countries. The announcement was made at a joint press conference with the Foreign Ministers of the two countries, stating inter-alliance that the deal established a partial demarcation of the sea boundaries between the two countries and that the remaining demarcation would be achieved through consultations. The parliaments of the two countries ratified the agreement swiftly, and in October 2020 Egyptian President Abdel Fattah el-Sisi signed the deal, which was then published by the official gazette of the country. Turkey dismissed the Greece – Egypt deal as “null and void”, adding Greece and Egypt have no mutual sea border.

Consequences
Following the agreement, Turkey and Libya's UN-recognized government had seen an increase in co-operation. This cooperation ranges from Turkish offshore exploration efforts to providing aid for the Government of National Accord for the Libyan Civil War (2014–2020). As the issues arising due to the dispute are still developing, the full consequences of this maritime dispute are yet to be seen.

A maritime deal between Egypt and Greece has been signed in response.

Cancellation by House of Representatives
The maritime deal was canceled by the Al-Bayda Court of Appeals of Libya in its 27 January 2021 ruling. The court ruled in favor of the Libyan House of Representatives which filed a lawsuit to declare the Memorandum as invalid. Unlike Turkey, Libya is a signatory to the UN Convention on the Law of the Sea, which defined the exclusive economic zone of Greece in 1982; though, it has not ratified it.

2022 preliminary energy exploration deal
In October 2022, Turkey and the Government of National Unity (Libya) (GNU) signed a preliminary energy exploration deal based on the previous deal. Greece and Egypt warned that they would oppose any activity in disputed areas, while the House of Representatives rejected the deal and said that it was signed by a government which doesn't have a mandate.

The European Union said that the details of the new agreement are not known yet and couldn't make a statement on that deal, but reminded that the previous agreement "does not comply with the Law of the Sea and cannot produce any legal consequences for third states".

On 9 January 2023, a Libyan court in Tripoli suspended the deal. The Turkish Foreign Minister said that the Libya's Government of National Unity (GNU) backs the deal despite the court suspension and that GNU told him "not to take seriously" the court ruling. The Libyan General Bar Association agreed with the court ruling.

See also
 Aegean dispute
 Exclusive economic zone of Greece
 Cyprus–Turkey maritime zones dispute
 Mediterranean Basin

Notes

Documents
 The document sent to the UN by Turkey and GNA: Memorandum of Understanding between the Government of the Republic of Turkey and the Government of National Accord – State of Libya on delimitation of the maritime jurisdiction areas in the Mediterranean

References

Libya–Turkey relations
Greece–Turkey relations
2019 in Turkey
2019 in Libya
2019 in international relations
November 2019 events in Africa
November 2019 events in Asia
November 2019 events in Europe
Politics of Libya
Politics of Turkey
Treaties of Turkey
Treaties of Libya
Treaties concluded in 2019
Boundary treaties
Recep Tayyip Erdoğan
November 2019 events in Turkey